Nkoranza (or Nkoransa) is a town located in the mid-north of Ghana. It is the district capital of the Nkoranza District in the Bono East Region.

A leading Brong town, the town led the 1892-93 Brong rebellion against the Ashanti.
Nkoranza is a town located in the newly created Bono East Region, from the Former Mother Region Brong Ahafo, which use to Host the now Ahafo Region and the current Bono East Region.
Nkoranza is now in the Bono East Region whose capital is Techiman. It is divided into two districts: Nkoranza North and Nkoranza south district. Nkoranza is having a market which mostly sell yams, maize and other food stuffs.

Nkoranza South District 
Nkoranza south is among the twenty-seven(27) administrative districts in the Brong Ahafo Region of Ghana. It is found in the center of the Brong Ahafo Region. It shares boundary with Nkoranza North District to the north. It consists of 126 settlements headed by one paramount chief.

Nkoranza North District 
Nkoranza north district is one of the twenty-seven (27) administrative districts in the Brong Ahafo Region. It has Busunya as its capital. It shares boundaries with Kintampo South to the south and Nkoranza South to the north

Transport 
Nkoranza is the location of a proposed railway station.

Education 

 St. Theresa Roman Catholic School
 Nkoranza Senior High Technical School

See also 
 Railway stations in Ghana

References 

Populated places in the Bono East Region